Varlam is both a masculine given name and a surname derived from the saint's name Barlaam, used predominantly in Orthodox cultures. Notable people with the name include:

Varlam Cherkezishvili (1846–1925), Georgian politician and journalist
Varlam Gelovani (1878–1915), Georgian lawyer and politician
Varlam Avanesov (1884–1930), Armenian Bolshevik and Soviet communist politician
Varlam Shalamov (1907–1982), Russian writer, journalist and poet
Varlam Kilasonia (born 1967), Georgian footballer and manager
Claudiu Varlam (born 1975), Romanian aerobic gymnast
Varlam Liparteliani (born 1989), Georgian judoka

See also
 Barlaam (disambiguation), the Western form
 Varlaam (disambiguation), another Eastern Orthodox form
 Varlamov, an East Slavic surname derived from Varlam

Georgian masculine given names